Kenichi Kimura may refer to:

, Japanese architect
, Japanese rugby union player